Convergence is a 1952 oil painting by Jackson Pollock.

Composition 
Convergence is one of the paintings by American artist Jackson Pollock, who is known as a representative of abstract expressionism. The composition was created on canvas, measuring 93.5 inches by 155 inches.  It is an oil painting, which constitutes a wide range of colors, lines and shapes, made by a method of dripping and pouring paint onto a canvas.

Reception and analysis 
These lines, spots, circles splattered on a canvas unintentionally convey the artist's emotions. The painting was made during the Cold War with Russia, and it is considered that the painting represents the idea of freedom of speech.

Other scholars, including Yve-Alain Bois, have posited that this type of individualistic interpretation fails to account for how Pollock allowed the forces of gravity and fluidity--not his own hand--to direct the pooling and mixing of the paint.

Influence 
Springbok Editions made the jigsaw puzzle called Convergence in 1964 based on the Pollock's painting. The puzzle consisted of 340 pieces and it was claimed as the most difficult puzzle in the world. The puzzle gained popularity in 1965 when hundreds of thousands of Americans acquired the puzzle.

See also

 No. 5, 1948 – Jackson Pollock

References

External links 
 Convergence by Jackson Pollock
 

Abstract expressionism
Paintings by Jackson Pollock
1952 paintings